"My Rough and Rowdy Days" is a song recorded by the American country music artist Waylon Jennings. It was released in September 1987 as the first single from the album A Man Called Hoss. The song reached number 6 on the Billboard Hot Country Singles and Tracks chart. It was written by Jennings and Roger Murrah.

Chart performance

References

1988 singles
1987 songs
Waylon Jennings songs
Songs written by Waylon Jennings
Songs written by Roger Murrah
Song recordings produced by Jimmy Bowen
MCA Records singles